The Common Man's Collapse is the second studio album by American metalcore band Veil of Maya. The album was produced by Michael Keene of The Faceless and was released through Sumerian Records on April 1, 2008.

The songs "Entry Level Exit Wounds" and "Sever the Voices" were re-recorded from the first album, All Things Set Aside. It is the first album by the band to include vocalist Brandon Butler and last with bassist Kris Higler.

Track listing

Personnel
Veil of Maya
 Brandon Butler - vocals
 Marc Okubo - lead/rhythm guitars
 Kris Higler - bass guitar
 Sam Applebaum - drums, percussion

Production
 Produced by Michael Keene of The Faceless

References

2008 albums
Veil of Maya albums
Sumerian Records albums